KLEW-TV (channel 3) is a television station licensed to Lewiston, Idaho, United States, affiliated with CBS. The station serves the Lewis–Clark Valley and Palouse regions of north-central Idaho and southeastern Washington, as well as Wallowa County, Oregon. Owned by Sinclair Broadcast Group, KLEW-TV maintains studios on 17th Street in Lewiston, and its transmitter is located near Clarkston, Washington.

Though identifying as a station in its own right, KLEW-TV is considered a semi-satellite of KIMA-TV (channel 29) in Yakima, which operates another semi-satellite, KEPR-TV (channel 19) in Tri-Cities, Washington. KLEW and KEPR simulcast all network and syndicated programming as provided through KIMA, but air separate commercial inserts, legal identifications and weeknight newscasts, and have their own websites. Master control and some internal operations are based at KOMO Plaza (formerly Fisher Plaza) in Seattle.

The area that KLEW-TV serves, including Lewiston, is part of the Spokane, Washington television market, and the station is one of two CBS affiliates in the market, along with Tegna Inc.-owned KREM (channel 2), which is licensed to Spokane and typically considered as the primary CBS affiliate for the market. Both stations are carried on Dish Network and DirecTV throughout the market.

History 
KLEW-TV signed on the air December 7, 1955 under the ownership of Cascade Broadcasting. It has always been a CBS affiliate; however, as a satellite of KIMA-TV, it also carried some programming from ABC and NBC in its early years. The station's original studio facilities were located on Idaho Street in Lewiston.

Filmways agreed to purchase Cascade Broadcasting for $3 million in 1968; the sale was approved the following year. Filmways sold KLEW-TV, KIMA-TV, and KEPR-TV to NWG Broadcasting for $1 million in 1972. In 1977, KLEW moved from its original studios on Idaho Street to its current location on 17th Street.

Retlaw Enterprises acquired the NWG stations, including KLEW-TV, for $17 million in 1986; the stations were operated as part of the Retlaw Broadcasting division. Fisher Companies (later known as Fisher Communications) agreed to purchase the Retlaw stations for $215 million on November 19, 1998, a deal that was completed in July 1999. On April 11, 2013, Fisher announced that it would sell its properties to the Sinclair Broadcast Group; the deal was completed on August 8, 2013.

Digital channels
The station's digital signal is multiplexed:

Translators

Newscasts
KLEW-TV airs local newscasts weeknights at 5:00, 6:00 and 11:00 p.m., local news cut-ins during the weekday edition of CBS Mornings from 7:00 to 9:00 a.m., that includes a short 5-minute interview segment called Northwest Morning, and simulcasts sister station KIMA-TV's 5:00 and 6:30 a.m. newscasts, as KLEW does not have morning, midday or weekend newscasts.

Notable former on-air staff
Nadine Woodward – weeknight news anchor (1985–1987). Currently mayor of Spokane, Washington.

References

External links

CBS network affiliates
Charge! (TV network) affiliates
Comet (TV network) affiliates
Television stations in Idaho
Sinclair Broadcast Group
Television channels and stations established in 1955
1955 establishments in Idaho
Low-power television stations in the United States
Lewiston, Idaho